= Azeem Azam =

Azeem Azam (Arabic pronunciation: [ˈAz’eem];( العظيم) born 16 October 1984) is a UK born Professional Footballer who has played for a number of European clubs.

== Club Career ==
Azam started of his club career as a youth with Nottingham Forest Academy. He moved from Forest to Leeds United,On trial However after suffering a ACL injury and now of contract Azam moved initial to train with a number of MLS clubs, Notably LA Galaxy and DC United, Having Rumored Azam had been offered a contract with MLS Azam decided to decline the offer due to MLS capping system and traveled back to the UK, now fully fit.

== AS Monaco ==
It was rumored Azam trained with French Ligue 1 team, AS Monaco in 2004/05, after a successful trial period Azam was awarded with a 1 year offer by the French outfit, however he spent all his time in the treatment room.

== Real Betis ==
In 2006 with Rumors abound it was clamied Azam signed with Spanish La Liga team Real Betis, Which was surrounded with controversy. The day Azam was due to sign both Manager and president stepped down, leaving Azam in a precarious position. It was Rumored Azam eventually signed, having had very good pre-season, he was most part out of favor with the new management.

== 2010 ==
Azam returned back to the UK having rumored Azam secured training with Premiership outfit Tottenham Hotspur FC. having spent a few training sessions with Spurs, Azam was sent off to Bisham Abbey to recover from a persistent knee issue. Having attracted the interest from other European Clubs,It was rumored Azam attracted attention from Turkish Giants Galatasaray.It was rumored Azam underwent a medical with Galatasaray which highlighted the need for a meniscus repair, as Azam underwent the operation, the offer Lapsed, after Galatasary had a dismal season.

== 2011 ==
Azam was a victim of a vicious online slander attack. His management took the culprits to court, and a injunction was granted in Azam's favor.

== 2012/13 ==
Despite his limited on-field exposure,and the rumor mill running rife it was claimed, Azam has managed to secure attractive offers from leading clubs. A number of media sources,have confirmed interest from both UEA Pro League Club AL Ahli and Italian Seria A side Palermo.
